Zimmermann is a luxury Australian brand of fashion. Zimmermann was founded in 1991 by sisters Nicky and Simone Zimmermann.

History 
Sisters Nicky and Simone Zimmermann founded the label in 1991, while the first store was opened in 1992. It all started in Sydney, when Nicky Zimmermann, who attended the design school in East Sydney, began designing garments from her parents' garage and selling them at Paddington markets where she could see first-hand how women responded to her clothing. Her sister Simone joined her later in 1991.

Zimmermann presents their ready-to-wear collections each year in both Australia and the USA at New York Fashion Week. In the following years, the Zimmermann label extended to Swim Separates, Kids, and Accessories. After the expansion, Zimmermann started making ready-to-wear collections available outside of Australia.

In 2008 Zimmermann also launched its online boutique at zimmermannwear.com.

Collections 
Since the launching in the USA in 2011, Zimmermann has followed a Northern Hemisphere calendar for collection release. This includes Spring/Summer, Fall and Resort collections for Ready to Wear, and Summer and Resort for Swim. The Zimmermann brand now includes the lines Ready-to-Wear, Swim and Resort, Kids, and Accessories.

Editorial 
The Zimmermann label has received acclaim from household names such as Beyoncé, Kendall Jenner, Gigi and Bella Hadid, Margot Robbie, Chrissy Teigen, Karlie Kloss, Jessica Alba, Kate Hudson, Paris Jackson, and Jessica Biel, all who have been sighted in Zimmermann designs.

Awards and recognitions 
The brand received the Australian Fashion Laureate Award in 2014, AFI Best Swimwear Designer, Prix de Marie Claire Best Swimwear Brand, and Prix de Marie Claire Best Swimwear Designer.

Nicky Zimmermann has been a member of the Australian Fashion Week Advisory Board and has previously been a mentor for the QANTAS Spirit of Australia Youth Awards. Nicky was also a founding board member of the Australian Fashion Chamber.

Locations 
Zimmermann has 27 stores located throughout Australia, the USA, and the UK.

The collections are stocked in stores internationally, including Barney's, Saks 5th Avenue, Bergdorf Goodman, Selfridges, Harrods, and Harvey Nichols. Zimmermann is also featured on Net-A- Porter.

Zimmermann also maintains showrooms in Sydney, London, France, Milan, New York and Los Angeles.

References

External links 
 

Australian companies established in 1991
Australian fashion
Clothing brands of Australia
Companies based in Sydney
High fashion brands